The palmar carpal branch of ulnar artery (volar carpal branch) is a small vessel which crosses the front of the carpus beneath the tendons of the Flexor digitorum profundus, and anastomoses with the corresponding branch of the radial artery.

References 

Arteries of the upper limb